William Jayne Jacoby (born April 10, 1969), known professionally as Billy Jayne and previously Billy Jacoby is an American actor. His siblings, Robert Jayne, Susan Jayne, Laura Jacoby, as well as his half-brother Scott Jacoby are also actors.

Early life
Jayne was born in Flushing, New York City, on April 10, 1969. He is of Jewish descent.  At the age of 3, he was visiting his older half-brother Scott Jacoby on the set of That Certain Summer, for which Scott won an Emmy for Best Supporting Actor. The director needed someone to play Jacoby in flashbacks, and Jayne was selected and began his career.

Although Jayne's birth name was not Jacoby, when he started his career his mother thought it would be best if he used Jacoby, the last name of his already established half-brother. At the age of 17, however, Billy Jacoby changed his professional name to Billy Jayne to coincide with his birth name.

Career
Jayne was a child actor from the mid to late 1980s, starring in numerous guest appearances on TV shows such as Trapper John, M.D.; The Golden Girls as Blanche's 14-year-old rebellious grandson David; The A-Team; and 21 Jump Street. He is also known for the role of Buddy, the brother of Terri, in Just One of the Guys from 1985.

Jayne is best known for his role in the teen show Parker Lewis Can't Lose, starring alongside actor Corin Nemec. The show ran from 1990 until 1993. After the show ended, he had smaller roles in shows such as Renegade, Murder One (1995), Walker, Texas Ranger (1996), Charmed (1999) and Cold Case (2009).

Filmography

Film

Television

As director

References

Bibliography
 Holmstrom, John. The Moving Picture Boy: An International Encyclopaedia from 1895 to 1995. Norwich, Michael Russell, 1996, p. 371.

External links

1969 births
American male film actors
American male television actors
American male child actors
American people of Jewish descent
Living people
Male actors from New York City
People from Queens, New York